John Braithwaite Wallis (1877–1961) was a Canadian entomologist, a graduate of the University of Manitoba. The J.B. Wallis Museum of Entomology at the university was named in his honour. He was also a coleopterologist, having described many beetle species including Haliplus leechi.

Sources

1877 births
1961 deaths
Canadian entomologists
University of Manitoba alumni